Negera is a genus of moths belonging to the subfamily Drepaninae.

Species
Negera bimaculata (Holland, 1893)
Negera clenchi Watson, 1965
Negera confusa Walker, 1855
Negera disspinosa Watson, 1965
Negera natalensis (Felder, 1874)
Negera quadricornis Watson, 1965
Negera ramosa Watson, 1965
Negera unispinosa Watson, 1965

References

Drepaninae
Drepanidae genera
Taxa named by Francis Walker (entomologist)